Out of the Unknown is a British television science fiction horror anthology drama series, produced by the BBC and broadcast on BBC2 in four series between 1965 and 1971. Most episodes of the first three series were a dramatisation of a science fiction short story. Some were written directly for the series, but most were adaptations of already-published stories.

The first three years were exclusively science fiction, but that genre was mostly abandoned in the final year in favour of horror-fantasy stories, with only one story based around science-fiction. Many videotapes of episodes were wiped in the early 1970s, as was standard procedure at the time. A large number of episodes are still missing, although some have resurfaced—for example, "Level Seven" from series two, originally broadcast on 27 October 1966, was returned to the BBC from the archives of a European broadcaster in January 2006.

Origins
Irene Shubik had been a science fiction fan since college. In 1961 suggested to her superior Sydney Newman, then head of the drama department of ABC Television, an ITV franchise contractor, with a proposal to create a science fiction version of Armchair Theatre. This became Out of this World, a sixty-minute anthology series hosted by Boris Karloff that ran for thirteen episodes between June and September 1962. Many of the episodes were adaptations of stories by writers including John Wyndham, Isaac Asimov and Philip K. Dick.

Series one

Shubik began work, and soon found that finding science fiction stories suitable for adaptation was a difficult task. She later recalled "I had to read hundreds of stories to pick a dozen. You have no idea how difficult some of these authors are to deal with, and it seems a special thing among SF writers to hedge themselves behind almost impossible copyright barriers, even when they have got a story that is possible to do on television. So many you can't. Either the conception is so way out you would need a fantastic budget to produce it, or the story is too short, too tight to be padded out to make an hour's television". When working on Out of this World Shubik had made a valuable contact in John Carnell, a key figure in British science fiction publishing. He was the founder of science fiction magazine New Worlds, and agent for many of Britain's science fiction writers. Carnell was able to suggest stories and authors for her to consider. Shubik received copies of science fiction anthologies from British publishers, and also sought advice from many authors including Frederik Pohl, Alfred Bester and Robert Silverberg. The latter two admitted to her that they had run into similar difficulties in finding suitable material for television adaptation. She considered asking Nigel Kneale if he would write a new Quatermass story for the series, and contacted Arthur C. Clarke regarding the possibility of adapting his novel The Deep Range.

In March 1965, Shubik travelled to New York City to negotiate rights with authors whose works she was considering, to seek ideas from US television, and to obtain more science fiction anthologies from US publishers. During her visit she met with US science fiction editors and also with Isaac Asimov, who granted permission for two of his stories to be adapted on the condition that they could only be shown in the UK: sales to foreign territories were not allowed. The trip to New York would become an annual event for her during her time on Out of the Unknown.

On her return to London, Shubik learned that she had been appointed producer and story editor for the new anthology series. She obtained the services of George Spenton-Foster as her associate producer. Spenton-Foster was a science fiction fan and his wide experience of BBC television production proved invaluable to Shubik. By this stage, she had found the twelve scripts she needed for the series: ten episodes would be adaptations of stories by John Wyndham ("Time to Rest" and its sequel "No Place Like Earth", dramatised together as "No Place Like Earth"); Alan Nourse ("The Counterfeit Man"); Isaac Asimov ("The Dead Past" and Sucker Bait); William Tenn ("Time in Advance"); Ray Bradbury ("The Fox and the Forest"); Kate Wilhelm ("Andover and the Android"); John Brunner ("Some Lapse of Time"); J. G. Ballard ("Thirteen to Centaurus") and Frederik Pohl ("The Midas Plague"). Two original stories—"Stranger in the Family" by David Campton and "Come Buttercup, Come Daisy, Come...?" by Mike Watts—were also commissioned. Among those commissioned to adapt the stories were a few notable names in television writing: Terry Nation, creator of the Daleks for Doctor Who and later of Survivors and Blake's 7, adapted Bradbury's "The Fox and the Forest" while Troy Kennedy Martin, co-creator of Z-Cars, adapted Pohl's "The Midas Plague".

A title for the series had not been decided when production began. Names including Dimension 4, The Edge of Tomorrow and From the Unknown were considered, before Out of the Unknown was settled upon. The title music was composed by Norman Kay and the title sequence was created by Bernard Lodge. It was intended from an early stage that, as with Boris Karloff on Out of this World, each story would be introduced by a regular host. Christopher Lee and Vincent Price were approached but were not available and the idea was dropped. The episode "Some Lapse of Time" is notable for having Ridley Scott, future director of such films as Alien and Blade Runner, as designer. The opening title sequence was designed by Bernard Lodge, utilising stock shots and specially created optical illusion patterns filmed on a rostrum camera, combined with a face frozen in a scream and a mannequin falling repeatedly through space contrived to create an eerie sense of suspense and intrigue. The forty-second sequence would win a Design & Art Direction Wood Pencil for Television Graphics in 1965. Delia Derbyshire of the BBC Radiophonic Workshop created a theme for the sequence, but it was rejected.

Out of the Unknown made its debut on Monday, 4 October 1965 at 8pm on BBC2, with Wyndham's "No Place Like Earth" selected as the opening story. Science fiction and fantasy was popular on television, with Doctor Who, The Avengers, Thunderbirds, The Man from UNCLE and Lost in Space all notable hits at the time. Out of the Unknown, however, would offer more adult, cerebral fare. Initial audience and critical reaction was mixed, but improved as the series went on with "Andover and the Android" ("It's not until intelligence, humour and gaiety break into television that you notice what tasteless pap we've been living on" – Daily Mail) and "Some Lapse of Time" ("It was not surprising to hear from Late Night Line Up that there had been many complimentary telephone calls after the play [...] it left the viewer with the disconcerting feeling that there was more than a grain of truth in its fantasy" – Birmingham Evening Mail and Dispatch) proving particularly popular with audiences and critics alike. BBC2 Controller David Attenborough praised the "overall professionalism that has become a hallmark of the series". By the end of its first run, Out of the Unknown was the second-most popular drama on BBC2, after the imported Western The Virginian.

Series one holds the distinction of being the only series to have its first and final broadcast episodes in existence. Series three and four are missing both, whilst series two is missing its final episode.

Series two

In parallel with preparing for the second series of Out of the Unknown, Shubik was tasked with producing another anthology series: Thirteen Against Fate, adaptations of short stories by Maigret creator Georges Simenon. To assist her, she was assigned a script editor—initially Rodney Gedye, and then when Gedye left following clashes with Shubik, Michael Imison. As with series one, finding suitable stories for adaptation remained a problem. On her annual visit to New York, Shubik placed an advertisement looking for stories in the Science Fiction Writers Association Bulletin. One author who answered the advertisement was Larry Eisenberg, whose stories The Fastest Draw and Too Many Cooks were commissioned. Two further adaptations, of E.M. Forster's "The Machine Stops" and Mordecai Roshwald's Level 7 (dramatised as "Level Seven"), were scripts that had been offered, without success, to film studios for some years. Another script, adapting Colin Kapp's Lambda 1, had been commissioned for series one but shelved, owing to technical considerations about how it could be realised. When special effects designer Jack Kine indicated that he had a solution to the technical challenges, the script was brought back into production for series two. Five further adaptations were commissioned: John Rankine's The World in Silence, Henry Kuttner's The Eye, Frederik Pohl's Tunnel Under the World and Isaac Asimov's "Satisfaction Guaranteed" and "Reason" (dramatised as "The Prophet"). Three original stories—"Frankenstein Mark II" by Hugh Whitemore, "Second Childhood" by Hugh Leonard and "Walk's End" by William Trevor—were also commissioned.

In response to Kenneth Tynan's use of the word "fuck" on the satirical programme BBC-3, Sydney Newman issued directives to his producers regarding language and content. In the case of Out of the Unknown, this led to particular attention being paid to the scripts for "Second Childhood" (about reawakening of sexual desire when an elderly man undergoes a rejuvenation process) and "Satisfaction Guaranteed" (about a woman taking a robot as a lover). The theme music was changed to a less trippy, more theatrical version with a faster pace.

Series two was broadcast on Thursday nights at 9:30pm, beginning with the episode "The Machine Stops" on 6 October 1966. The new series was promoted in listings magazine Radio Times with a front cover of "The Machine Stops"’ star Yvonne Mitchell and an article previewing the upcoming episodes, written by Michael Imison. The two most notable productions of the series were "The Machine Stops" and "Level Seven". "The Machine Stops", directed by Philip Saville, was a particularly challenging production—later described by Shubik as "the most complex and technically demanding script I have ever had in my hand"—requiring large and complex sets, including construction of one with a working monorail. The effort paid off, however, as the adaptation was met with good reviews ("A haunting film – and a deeply disturbing one" – The Times) and was awarded first prize at the Fifth Festival Internazionale del Film di Fantascienza (International Science Fiction Film Festival) in Trieste on 17 July 1967. Due to the expected complexities of editing, the episode was recorded onto 35mm film instead of videotape, and still exists as this original film negative. As such, it is the only episode produced during the show's black and white era to exist in its original broadcast format.

"Level Seven" was adapted by J. B. Priestley and directed by Rudolph Cartier. Priestley's script had begun life as a potential screenplay for a feature film, and condensing it down to Out of the Unknown'''s standard running time of fifty minutes proved impossible. In the end, Shubik convinced the management of the BBC to allow "Level Seven" to run to sixty minutes as a one-off exceptional measure. Reviewing "Level Seven" in The Listener, J. C. Trewin said, "the tension was inescapable, the excitement incontestable, more so, undoubtedly, than other thrusts into the future". The robot costumes created for "The Prophet" were later reused in the Doctor Who serial "The Mind Robber".

Despite its positive reception, only four of the thirteen episodes are known to survive. Series two of Out of the Unknown had built on the success of the first series. However, as Irene Shubik and Michael Imison began work on the third series, major changes were implemented.

Series three

Shubik was in the middle of her third trip to New York in early 1967 when she received a call from Sydney Newman offering her the opportunity to co-produce, with Graeme McDonald, BBC1's most prestigious drama slot, The Wednesday Play. Shubik accepted the new post but insisted that she be given time to commission a full series of Out of the Unknown scripts before moving on to The Wednesday Play and handing Out of the Unknown over to a new production team. At the same time, Michael Imison also moved on to produce Thirty Minute Theatre.

For series three, Shubik commissioned dramatisations of stories by Robert Sheckley (Immortality, Inc.); Isaac Asimov (Liar! and The Naked Sun (the sequel to The Caves of Steel which Shubik had dramatised for Story Parade in 1963)); John Brunner (The Last Lonely Man); Clifford D. Simak (Beach Head and Target Generation); John Wyndham (Random Quest); Cyril M. Kornbluth (The Little Black Bag); Rog Phillips (The Yellow Pill) and Peter Phillips (Get Off My Cloud).  Original stories were provided by Donald Bull ("Something in the Cellar"), Brian Hayles ("1+1=1.5") and Michael Ashe ("The Fosters").  Two scripts, "The Yellow Pill" and "Target Generation", had previously been used in Shubik's earlier anthology series Out of this World.

In September 1967, Alan Bromly and Roger Parkes were appointed as, respectively, the new producer and script editor. Bromly and Parkes both had a background in thriller series. With all the scripts already commissioned, Bromly and Parkes' role was mainly to shepherd them through production. A new opening title sequence was implemented, which was essentially a green and orange colourisation of the original. This was created when colourisation was a relatively uncommon process, particularly for television, so the results of each image vary.

Series three – the first Out of the Unknown series to be made in colour – was broadcast on Wednesday nights beginning on 7 January 1969 with the episode "Immortality, Inc.". One viewer of "Immortality, Inc." was George Harrison of the Beatles, who can be seen discussing the episode with bandmate Ringo Starr in the film Let It Be. Scheduled opposite the very popular ITV drama series The Power Game, the series suffered in the ratings and met with mixed reviews; the Daily Express found the series "most erratic", sometimes "wonderfully inventive" but at other times "as silly as a comic strip in a child's magazine". The production of "Random Quest" led its author, John Wyndham, to write to director Christopher Barry praising "the hard work and ingenuity of a great number of people concerned [...] excellent work by everybody – not forgetting the adapter. My thanks to everyone [...] for weaving it all together so skillfully". "Beach Head" was entered into the Sixth Festival Internazionale del Film di Fantascienza in July 1968, in the hope of repeating the earlier success of "The Machine Stops", but did not win.Get off my Cloud included Doctor Who's prop of the TARDIS exterior and the scenes were recorded in August 1968.

Series three is infamous for being the most incomplete season of the show. While several clips and audio recordings exist for the missing episodes, only one episode, "The Last Lonely Man", exists in its entirety as its original colour videotape master. "The Little Black Bag" only exists partially (roughly 20 minutes of footage, mainly from the first act, is missing).

Series four

The fourth series of Out of the Unknown began production in early 1970. Bromly and Parkes were now free to put their own creative mark on the series. Encouraged by Head of Plays Gerald Savory, they sought to recast Out of the Unknown as "not straight science fiction, but with a strong horror content, all starting out from a realistic basis". The decision to move towards psychological horror came about partly because of the difficulties involved in finding suitable science fiction scripts, partly because the production team felt that their budget could not compete with the glossy fare offered by the likes of 2001: A Space Odyssey and Star Trek (the latter had just begun to be broadcast in the UK at this time), and partly because it was felt that science fiction could not compete with the real-life drama of the Apollo moon landings then occurring.

Another major change for series four was a move away from adapting novels and short stories. Only one episode of series four – "Deathday", based on the novel by Angus Hall, dramatised by Brian Hayles – was an adaptation; the remaining ten episodes were original works. The opening title sequence was changed again, designed by Charles McGhie, employing a variety of techniques, from computer generated images to realtime visual effects and stop frame model animation. The outlines of a face appearing through a sheet of latex pre-empts his more extensive use of the same technique a decade later in his titles for Jonathan Miller's series The Body in Question. The music used was "Lunar Landscape" by Roger Roger.

Series four was broadcast on Wednesday nights beginning on 21 April 1971. Both ratings and critical reception were positive, although some viewers were disappointed by the move away from hard science fiction – a typical comment was that of Martin J. Pitt, who wrote to Radio Times that "it will be a pity if the opinions of people like Alan Bromly rob television of the opportunity to present intelligent and exciting science fiction". "To Lay a Ghost" was a particularly controversial production at the time due to its "somewhat questionable" depiction of rape and sexual repression. Its notoriety has continued to grow and its artistic value continues to be debated.

Although the fourth series was judged to be a success, the BBC chose not to renew Out of the Unknown for a fifth series. With the exception of the Play for Today spin-off, Play for Tomorrow, no regular lengthy science fiction anthology series has been made by a UK broadcaster since Out of the Unknown went off air. Of the eleven episodes produced during its final year, only five are known to exist, with the first and final episodes missing.

Episode list

Archive status
Of the forty-nine episodes of Out of the Unknown that were made, only twenty survive in their entirety, mainly from series one. Almost thirty minutes of "The Little Black Bag" also survive, as do shorter clips from "The Fox and the Forest", "Andover and the Android", "Satisfaction Guaranteed", "Liar!" and "The Last Witness". Complete audio recordings exist of "Beach Head", "The Yellow Pill" and "The Uninvited" as well as an almost complete recording of "The Naked Sun" and audio clips of other lost episodes. Off-screen photographs, known as tele-snaps, were taken of many first- and second-series stories, including some of the missing episodes. These were published in Mark Ward's Out of the Unknown: A guide to the legendary BBC series in 2004. The fourth-series episodes "The Last Witness" and "The Uninvited", both of which are missing, were remade as episodes of Hammer House of Mystery and Suspense – respectively as "A Distant Scream" and "In Possession" – and broadcast in the UK in 1986. A new adaptation of John Wyndham's Random Quest, which had been dramatised for series three and had also been adapted as the film Quest for Love, was made for BBC Four and broadcast on 27 November 2006 as part of that channel's Science Fiction Britannia season.

The episode "Level Seven" was returned to the archive as a film copy by a European broadcaster in 2006, shown at the British Film Institute South Bank in August 2009, while the episode "Thirteen to Centaurus" was repeated by BBC Four in 2003 as part of a J. G. Ballard retrospective.

All surviving episodes of Out of the Unknown, as well as reconstructions and clips of some of the missing episodes (except "The Last Witness", which has a surviving clip that wasn't included), were released on DVD by the BFI on 24 November 2014 (delayed from 27 October), with audio commentaries and interviews with cast and crew, a new documentary called Return of the Unknown'', extensive stills galleries, and a fully illustrated booklet with essays by show expert Mark Ward with full episode credits.

The BBC Archive Treasure Hunt, a public appeal campaign, continues to search for lost episodes.

Notes

Sources

External links
 Out of the Unknown articles at www.625.org.uk
 Out of the Unknown at the British Film Institute's Screen Online
 Detailed, illustrated guide to the surviving Out of the Unknown clips at Zeta Minor
 Out of the Unknown recalled at the BBC's My Science Fiction Life
 Missing Out of the Unknown episodes at the BBC's Treasure Hunt
 
Out of the Unknown at OldFutures

1965 British television series debuts
1971 British television series endings
1960s British science fiction television series
1970s British science fiction television series
1960s British anthology television series
1970s British anthology television series
BBC television dramas
British fantasy television series
British science fiction television shows
British supernatural television shows
Lost BBC episodes
English-language television shows
Black-and-white British television shows
Science fiction anthology television series